The 1979–80 Yugoslav First League was won by Red Star Belgrade.

Teams
A total of eighteen teams contested the league, including sixteen sides from the 1978–79 season and two sides promoted from the 1978–79 Yugoslav Second League (YSL) as winners of the two second level divisions East and West. The league was contested in a double round robin format, with each club playing every other club twice, for a total of 34 rounds. Two points were awarded for wins and one point for draws.

NK Zagreb and OFK Belgrade were relegated from the 1978–79 Yugoslav First League after finishing the season in bottom two places of the league table. The two clubs promoted to top level were Vardar and Čelik.

Events and incidents

Week 25: Death of Marshal Tito, three matches abandoned

Hajduk v. Red Star Belgrade
The season's week 25 derby match, pitting reigning league champions Hajduk versus current league leaders Red Star, on 4 May 1980 at Poljud Stadium in Split was abandoned in the 41st minute due to the announcement of the death of Marshal Tito that was followed by a mass display of public grief within the stadium by fans and players alike. 

Played on a Sunday afternoon, the televised contest was in the 41st minute when three men entered the pitch, signalling to the referee—Husref Muharemagić of Janja—to stop the match and gather players of both teams in the centre circle. With the contest halted, Split mayor  took to the stadium's public address system to formally announce to the 50,000+ crowd that the Yugoslav lifetime president Josip Broz Tito had died. The match score was tied at 1–1 at the time of abandonment with Pižon Petrović scoring on a penalty kick for 0-1 before Zlatko Vujović's 1-1 equalizer. Incidentally, the match was the first time Red Star Belgrade played a competitive match at the newly built Poljud Stadium that had opened the previous summer.

Sudden scenes of mass crying at the stadium followed Skataretiko's announcement; some players—such as Hajduk's twenty-one-year-old striker Zlatko Vujović—collapsed down to the ground and weeped as the crowd launched into a rendition of "" ('Comrade Tito, We Give You Our Word'), a popular personality cult song professing loyalty and devotion to Comrade Tito. 

The Yugoslav Football Association (FSJ) declared the match null and void, ordering a replay for Wednesday, 21 May 1980 at the same venue. Two and a half weeks later, Red Star won the derby replay 3–1.

FK Sarajevo v. NK Osijek
Meanwhile, at Koševo Stadium during the FK Sarajevo vs. NK Osijek match, the news of Tito's death broke in the 43rd minute with the contest locked at 1-1.

Dinamo Zagreb v. FK Željezničar
The matches – along with a third between Dinamo and Zeljeznicar – were immediately abandoned, with the decision being made by the Yugoslav FA to declare the matches null and void, and order replays two and a half weeks later on Wednesday, 21 May 1980 at the same stadiums.

League table

Results

Winning squad

Top scorers

See also
1979–80 Yugoslav Second League
1979–80 Yugoslav Cup

References

External links
Yugoslavia Domestic Football Full Tables

Yugoslav First League seasons
Yugo
1979–80 in Yugoslav football